8,5′-Diferulic acid is a non cyclic type of diferulic acid. It is the predominant diferulic acid in sugar beet pulp. It is also found in barley, in maize bran and rye. 8,5′-Diferulic acid has also been identified to be covalently linked to carbohydrate moieties of the arabinogalactan-protein fraction of gum arabic.

See also 
 Decarboxylated 8,5'-diferulic acid

References

External links 
 5-8'-Dehydrodiferulic acid at phenol-explorer.eu

O-methylated hydroxycinnamic acids
Hydroxycinnamic acid dimers
Vinylogous carboxylic acids